The Independent Civic Organisation of South Africa (ICOSA) is a minor South African political party. It was founded by former Karoo District Municipality manager Truman Prince, who was expelled from the African National Congress (ANC) in 2006. He was reinstated as municipal manager by the municipal council in June, 2007, after a protracted legal battle, but was fired from his post in August of that same year through provincial vote. Convicted child rapist Jeffrey Donson, formerly of the National People's Party (NPP), is the current president of ICOSA.

The Democratic Alliance/ICOSA coalition took power in the Kannaland Local Municipality in August 2006 when the short-lived ANC-led coalition pact with the DA collapsed. The coalition of the DA and ICOSA collapsed when two ICOSA and three ANC councillors crossed the floor giving the NPP five seats out of nine in the council or an outright majority (the only such council in SA that was governed by this fledgling new party at the time). The DA refused to recognise the new NPP-led council administration as it alleged that the two ICOSA defectors were sacked prior to the floor-crossing window being open and were then challenged in the Cape High Court. As such its former mayor refused to "step down" pending the outcome of the case, creating uncertainty and instability in this beleaguered council.

In 2011, ICOSA regained its plurality in the Kannaland municipality, and has retained its plurality in the subsequent elections.

Controversy
Leader Jeffrey Donson was convicted of statutory rape and indecent assault of a 15-year-old girl while employed as Kannaland’s mayor in 2008, and his deputy Werner Meshoa was convicted of fraud and obstruction of justice during his tenure as speaker on the Kannaland council. After the 2021 South African municipal elections, with the support of the African National Congress, Donson was again elected mayor and Meshoa deputy mayor, leading to strong criticism.

Election results

National elections

|-
! Election
! Total votes
! Share of vote
! Seats
! +/–
! Government
|-
! 2019
| 12,386
| 0.07%
| 
| –
|
|}

Provincial elections

! rowspan=2 | Election
! colspan=2 | Eastern Cape
! colspan=2 | Free State
! colspan=2 | Gauteng
! colspan=2 | Kwazulu-Natal
! colspan=2 | Limpopo
! colspan=2 | Mpumalanga
! colspan=2 | North-West
! colspan=2 | Northern Cape
! colspan=2 | Western Cape
|-
! % !! Seats
! % !! Seats
! % !! Seats
! % !! Seats
! % !! Seats
! % !! Seats
! % !! Seats
! % !! Seats
! % !! Seats
|-
! 2019
| - || -
| - || -
| 0.03% || 0/73
| - || -
| - || -
| - || -
| - || -
| - || -
| 0.46% || 0/42
|}

Municipal elections

|-
! Election
! Votes
! %
! Seats
|-
! 2016
| 44,242
| 0.11%
| 11
|-
! 2021
| 21,273
| 0.09%
| 8
|-
|}

References

2006 establishments in South Africa
African National Congress breakaway groups
Political parties in South Africa
Political parties established in 2006